Alfredo Pezzana (31 March 1893 – 7 May 1986) was an Italian fencer. He won a gold medal in the team épée event at the 1936 Summer Olympics.

References

External links 
 
 

1893 births
1986 deaths
Italian male fencers
Olympic fencers of Italy
Fencers at the 1936 Summer Olympics
Olympic gold medalists for Italy
Olympic medalists in fencing
Sportspeople from Turin
Medalists at the 1936 Summer Olympics